Niels Flemming Lærkeborg Hansen (born 16 May 1974 in Vejle) is a Danish politician, who is a member of the Folketing for the Conservative People's Party. He was elected into parliament at the 2019 Danish general election.

Political career
Hansen was elected into parliament after the 2019 election, where he received 3,780 votes.

External links 
 Biography on the website of the Danish Parliament (Folketinget)

References 

Living people
1974 births
People from Vejle Municipality
Conservative People's Party (Denmark) politicians
Members of the Folketing 2019–2022
Members of the Folketing 2022–2026